This is a list episodes from the fifteenth season of Real Time with Bill Maher. A new arrangement of the theme music and a new set were introduced this season.

Episodes

References

External links 
 HBO.com Episode List
 HBO.com Real Time with Bill Maher Free (audio-only) episodes and Overtime podcast
 TV.com Episode Guide
 

Real Time with Bill Maher
Real Time with Bill Maher seasons